Kobuz may refer to:

Kobuz, Gryfice County, Poland
Kobuz, Szczecinek County, Poland
SZD-21 Kobuz, aerobatic glider

See also